Country Music: The Spirit of America is a 2003 documentary film, in the IMAX format, written and co-produced by Tom Neff and co-directed by Neff, Steven Goldmann and Keith Melton. Randy Scruggs was also a producer on the film and wrote the music score. The film traces the history of the United States in the 20th Century through country music, and is also known as Our Country.

Cast
 Hannah Swanson as Time Traveling Sprite
 Emily Lalande as Time Traveling Sprite
 Austin Stout as Austin
 Benton Jennings as Comic Old West Cowboy
 Tommy Barnes as Stage Manager
 Terry Ike Clanton as Crazed Prisoner
 Tony Nudo as Joe, man at the train station
 Jaclynn Tiffany Brown as Fresh Faced Teen

Interviews and music performers
 Trace Adkins
 Alabama
 Jessica Andrews
 Béla Fleck
 Guy Clark
 Charlie Daniels
 Joe Diffie
 Crystal Gayle
 Vince Gill
 Billy Gilman
 Hal Holbrook as narrator
 Alan Jackson
 Alison Krauss
 Lyle Lovett
 Loretta Lynn
 Kathy Mattea
 Martina McBride
 Roger McGuinn
 Leigh Nash
 Randy Owen
 Dolly Parton
 Minnie Pearl - archival
 Earl Scruggs
 Marty Stuart
 Pam Tillis
 Ernest Tubb - archival
 Porter Wagoner
 Lee Ann Womack

Reception
When the film was released, Jane Sumner, film critic for The Dallas Morning News, lauded the film, and wrote, "It's been three years coming. But now that it's here, the IMAX film Our Country, originally titled Twang, makes a rousing addition to this year's State Fair of Texas ... Written and produced by Tom Neff, who produced the six-part TV miniseries America's Music: The Roots of Country for TBS, the documentary celebrates country music as a mirror of the American experience across 90 years ... Vintage photos, archival news footage (including a shot of O. J. Simpson trying on that pesky glove) and Mr. Neff's intelligent, lyrical commentary, narrated by Hal "Deep Throat" Holbrook, trace the history of country music as it parallels the nation's."

See also
 America's Music: The Roots of Country
 List of IMAX films

References

External links
 Tom Neff official web site
 
 Tom Neff interview at Big Movie Zone

2003 films
2003 short documentary films
American country music
American short documentary films
Documentary films about country music and musicians
Films directed by Tom Neff
IMAX short films
American independent films
IMAX documentary films
2003 independent films
2000s English-language films
2000s American films